George Bertram Atkins (17 January 1885 – 27 February 1946) was an Australian rules footballer who played for the South Melbourne Football Club and St Kilda Football Club in the Victorian Football League (VFL).

Notes

External links 

1885 births
1946 deaths
Australian rules footballers from Tasmania
Sydney Swans players
St Kilda Football Club players
Essendon Association Football Club players